Produced by Ashi Productions, the anime series  is the title of two different magical-girl anime; this list covers the 1991 second series. The series premiered in Japan on Nippon Television on October 2, 1991 where it ran for 65 episodes (including three unaired episodes) until its conclusion on December 23, 1992.

See also
List of Minky Momo 1982 episodes

References

1991 Japanese television seasons
Minky Momo 1991

ja:魔法のプリンセス ミンキーモモのエピソード一覧#『魔法のプリンセスミンキーモモ 夢を抱きしめて』（1991年）